The  is an industry trade group composed of Japanese corporations involved in the music industry. It was founded in 1942 as the Japan Phonogram Record Cultural Association, and adopted its current name in 1969.

The RIAJ's activities include promotion of music sales, enforcement of copyright law, and research related to the Japanese music industry. It publishes the annual RIAJ Year Book, a statistical summary of each year's music sales, as well as distributing a variety of other data.

Headquartered in Minato, Tokyo, the RIAJ has twenty member companies and a smaller number of associate and supporting members; some member companies are the Japanese branches of multinational corporations headquartered elsewhere.

The association is responsible for certifying gold and platinum albums and singles in Japan.

RIAJ Certification
In 1989, the Recording Industry Association of Japan introduced the music recording certification systems. It is awarded based on shipment figures of compact disc or cassette tape which was reported by record labels. In principle, the criteria are limitedly applied to the materials released after January 21, 1989.

Certification awards
Currently, all music sales including singles, albums, digital download singles are on the same criteria. Unlike many countries, the highest certification is called "Million".

Old criteria (until June 2003)
Before the unification of criteria and introduction of music videos category in July 2003, a separate scale had been used for certification awards.

Digital certifications

Certifications for songs and albums released digitally began on September 20, 2006, using download data collected since the early 2000s. On February 28, 2014, the Chaku-uta Full and PC categories were merged to create the  category.

While digital album certifications are possible, only a few albums have received this certification since the RIAJ began awarding it, including the 2011 Songs for Japan charity album, and Hikaru Utada's sixth studio album Fantôme. In 2021, Ayumi Hamasaki's A Complete: All Singles (2008) became the first album released in the 2000s to receive digital certification.

Streaming only
As of April 2020, RIAJ has begun to certify songs for streaming, just how it does for physical shipments and digital download sales.

Unlike physical shipments and digital download sales, the streaming certifications have their own levels, due to the higher amount of streams compared to the other formats.

Members

Main members
 Avex Group¹
 Avex Entertainment
 Avex Digital (supporting member) 
 Being Inc.
 Dreamusic Incorporated
 For Life Music
 Geneon Universal Entertainment¹
 King Records¹
 Bellwood Records (supporting member)
 King Records International (supporting member)
 Nippon Columbia
 Columbia Marketing (supporting member)
 Nippon Crown¹
 Pony Canyon¹
 Exit Tunes (associate member)
 Sony Music Entertainment Japan¹
 Ariola Japan (supporting member)
 DefStar Records (supporting member)
 Epic Records Japan (supporting member)
 Ki/oon Records (supporting member)
 SME Records (supporting member)
 Sony Music Artists (supporting member)
 Sony Music Associated Records (supporting member)
 Sony Music Direct (supporting member)
 Sony Music Distribution (supporting member)
 Sony Music Japan International (supporting member)
 Sony Music Records (supporting member)
 Teichiku Entertainment¹
 Tokuma Japan Communications¹
 Universal Music Group¹
 EMI Music Japan¹
 VAP Inc.¹ 
 Victor Entertainment¹
 Warner Music Group¹
 Yamaha Music Communications
 Yoshimoto R&C

Associate members
 Amuse Soft Entertainment
 HATS Unlimited
 Johnny and Associates
 J Storm
 Johnny's Entertainment
 Konami Digital Entertainment
 Bandai Visual
 Lantis (main member)
 LD&K Records
 Naxos Records
 Pryaid Records¹
 Stardust Records
 Space Shower Networks
 Spiritual Beast
 Venus Records
 Village Again Association
 NBC Universal Entertainment Japan
 KISS Entertainment
 Rambling Records
 Gambit
 Croix

Supporting members
 Aniplex (subsidiary of Sony Music Entertainment Japan)
 Crown-Tokuma Music (joint venture of Nippon Crown and Tokuma Japan Communications)
 Free Board
 Holiday Japan
 Jei One
 NPPDevelop
 T-Toc Records
 TV Asahi Music
 Ward Records
 Toys Factory
 Aceforce Entertainment
 Kino Music

¹Member, International Federation of the Phonographic Industry.

See also
List of best-selling albums in Japan
List of best-selling singles in Japan
List of best-selling music artists in Japan
Recording Industry Association of America
Australian Recording Industry Association
List of music recording sales certifications
RIAJ Digital Track Chart
Global music industry market share data

References

External links
Recording Industry Association of Japan - in English

 
Organizations established in 1942
1942 establishments in Japan
Music organizations based in Japan